The HBK Gang (abbreviation for the Heartbreak Gang) is an American hip hop collective based in Richmond, California and the San Francisco Bay Area. Founded by Iamsu!, Chief, Skipper and P-Lo in 2008, members also include singer Kehlani and rapper-producers Sage the Gemini, IsThatCJ, Rossi, Dave Steezy, Jay Ant, and Kool John. After contributing to various mixtapes, including Iamsu's Kilt II, in August of 2013 the group released their debut mixtape Gang Forever. HBK Gang Records is the name of an associated independent record label.

History

Founding
HBK Gang is primarily composed of friends who met while attending high-school in the San Francisco Bay Area, specifically Pinole. The collective was founded in 2008, while many involved were still in school. As of 2013, members include Iamsu!, Kool John, P-Lo, Sage the Gemini, Skipper (or $kip), CJ, singer Rossi, Dave Steezy and Jay Ant (or Jay Anthony).  Iamsu! first began to found and organize the group in 2011.

Iamsu! was born Sudan Ahmeer Williams in Richmond, California, on November 17, 1989, and was an early fan of artists such as Kanye West, R. Kelly, Aaliyah, Marching Band, and reggae music. He later worked as a rapper and producer with artists such as Jonn Hart and Wiz Khalifa, and met P-Lo in 2005. P-Lo had been inspired by Kanye West's debut album The College Dropout to begin creating beats in his youth, and also produced for Wiz Khalifa "Bout Me" and Yo Gotti's single "Act Right" featuring Young Jeezy and YG, the latter of which peaked at #100 on the Billboard Hot 100. P-Lo joined Iamsu! in the production duo The Invasion shortly after their meeting, starting a trend of collaboration between future members. Iamsu! also collaborated with Sage the Gemini on Sage's track "Gas Pedal" in March 2013, which peaked at #4 on the Billboard Hot Rap Songs and at #29 on the Billboard Hot 100, making it both artists' first top 40 hit.

Early releases
The Heartbreak Gang was performing and releasing music as early as 2011, and in August 2011 performed at the debut release party for Tha Outfit's "Like My Bass" music video. The group featured artists Dave Steezy and Mike Dash-E in their music, releasing the track "Gettin' It" featuring Kool John in 2012. In January 2013 Iamsu! was a guest for Jonn Hart on Hart's "Who Booty" video.

The crew contributed to all of Iamsu's mixtapes, including Kilt II in June 2013, with other guest appearances including Problem, Juvenile, Ty Dolla Sign, Terrace Martin, Tank, and Mistah F.A.B.

Gang Forever (2013)

HBK Gang released their debut compilation mixtape Gang Forever on August 12, 2013. It includes 17 tracks featuring different members of the collective. Much of the album's production was handled by The Invasion (the production team of Iamsu!, P-Lo, Kuya Beats, Jay Ant, and Chief), with tracks also produced by Cardo, AKA Frank, Kuya Beats, Sage the Gemini, and Jay Ant.

Touring, music videos
The collective toured the western United States during September and August 2013, hitting locations such as Seattle, Spokane, Phoenix, Santa Barbara, and Reno, Nevada. Titled the HBK Forever Tour, it featured Iamsu! as headliner and Kool John and Jay Ant as support. Hip hop dancing is an important element of the live shows. According to Sage the Gemini, dancing is also a key aspect of the group's creative process. The collective has released both tour videos and a number of music videos for their songs, including "Go Crazy".

Members
Current
Iamsu! – group founder, hip hop recording artist and producer from Richmond, California. 
Skipper – rapper
Sage the Gemini – hyphy and hip hop recording artist from Fairfield, California, who released "Gas Pedal" in 2013.
P-Lo – rapper/member of the production team The Invasion
CJ – also goes by *HBK CJ and *IsThatCJ
Jay Anthony – rapper/member of the production team The Invasion
Kool John – rapper
Rossi – vocals
Azure – DJ/rapper
Dave Steezy – rapper
Kehlani  – Singer

Record label

HBK Gang is also the name of a record label, which as of 2013 has released most of Iamsu's mixtapes and albums, including Su! The Right Thing (2010), Young California (2011), Kilt (2012), Stoopid (2012), and $uzy 6 $peed (2012). 2013 saw the release of his album Million Dollar Afro, which also featured Problem and was co-released on Problem's label Diamond Lane Music Group. Iamsu!'s Kilt II mixtape followed in 2013, while The HBK Gang's first mixtape Gang Forever was released in August 2013. The label's first in-store release, was Iamsu!'s debut album Sincerely Yours, which was released on May 13, 2014.

Discography

Singles
2012: "Gettin' It" featuring Kool John 
2013: "STU Freestyle"

Mixtapes

Music videos
2012: "Gettin' It" featuring Kool John – directed by Chris Simmons
2013: "STU Freestyle" – directed by tyCA
2013: "Go Crazy" – directed by Daghe
2013: "Losin" – directed by HBK GADGET
2013: "Quit Cattin" – directed by David Camarena
2013:"Rep That Gang" – directed by HBK GADGET 
2013: "Father God" – directed by HBK GADGET
2014 "Bad Boyz" – directed by HBK GADGET
2014: "Cover Girl" – directed by HBK GADGET
2015: "L" – directed by HBK GADGET
2015: "Interlude" – directed by HBK GADGET

See also
Hyphy
List of West Coast hip hop artists

References

External links
The HBK Gang on YouTube
The HBK Gang on SoundCloud)

 
Hip hop groups from California
Musical groups established in 2011
Hip hop collectives
Musical groups from the San Francisco Bay Area
2011 establishments in California